George R. Fraser (born 1932) is a medical geneticist. In 1962, he described the condition later known as Fraser syndrome.

References

1932 births
British geneticists
Living people